The Deer Island Prison (–1991) in Suffolk County, Massachusetts was located on Deer Island in Boston Harbor. Once known as the Deer Island House of Industry and later, House of Correction, it held people convicted of drunkenness, illegal possession of drugs, disorderly conduct, larceny, and other crimes subject to relatively short-term sentencing. When it closed in 1991, some 1,500 inmates were being held at Deer Island.

History

House of Industry
Originally, Deer Island's House of Industry (est. 1853) was an almshouse. It was one of several efforts on the island to accommodate poor children and adults. However, by around 1880 "without any change in the legal appellation 'House of Industry,' that term has come to be understood as designating its penal character."

An article in the national Frank Leslie's Sunday Magazine (1884) described the prisoners on Deer Island in the 1880s: "they in the main are from the lowest stratum of the cosmopolitan society of New England's metropolis, embracing representatives of almost every nationality under the sun, and from the shortness of the sentences, many being confined for 10 days only, for nonpayment of one dollar and costs for drunkenness, and none for more than a year."

House of Correction
Prior to 1896, the Suffolk County "House of Correction was located in South Boston. ... By Chapter 536 sec. 15 of the Acts of 1896 ... all the prisoners sentenced there were transferred to the former House of Industry on Deer Island. ... The last inmates were transferred from the South Boston facility by October 1902."

In the 20th century, the prison was administered by the Penal Institutions Department and the Penal Commissioner of Boston. In 1991 about 880 inmates were transferred permanently to the Suffolk County House of Correction in South Boston. The Deer Island prison buildings were razed in 1992 to prepare for the construction of the Deer Island Waste Water Treatment Plant, an outcome of the Clean Water Act.
In the film The Last Detail, the prison was used as the backdrop for Portsmouth Naval Prison.The prison was also shown in the 1978 motion picture the Brinks Job starring Peter Falk.

Noteworthy inmates
 Luigi Galleani
 John Runnings
 Prescott Townsend
Margaret Brown aka. Old Mother Hubbard
Oliver Garrett
George H. Battis
Mark Wahlberg

References in literature

In Sylvia Plath's novel  The Bell Jar, the protagonist, Esther Greenwood, visits Deer Island Prison. 
Plath also mentions Deer Island Prison in her poem "Man in Black."

In Dennis Lehane's novel Mystic River, the character Jimmy  Marcus served two years in Deer Island Prison in Winthrop.

Alternative names
 Deer Island Jail, Winthrop
 Deer Island Penal Institution, Winthrop
 House of Correction at Deer Island
 Suffolk County House of Correction, Deer Island

Images

References

Further reading
Published in the 1900s-1930s
 John Koren. Some statistics of recidivism among misdemeanants in Boston. American Statistical Association, new ser. 54, June 1901; p. 1-41.
 Journal Forbidden Deer Island by Gerrish Peerless Master of House of Correction Censors News. Boston Journal, August 2, 1905.
 McSwane gives up; He Got Away from Deer Island House of Correction, but Couldn't Swim Shirley Gut. Boston Daily Globe, Apr 16, 1906. p. 12.
 Grand Jury Takes Trip to Deer Island, Inspects House of Correction. Boston Journal, August 16, 1907.
 Corruption, extravagance; Charges Against Deer Island Prison. Ex-Rep Luce Says Releases Were Bought by Money. Should Verify Accusations, Martin Declares. Some Figures. Political influence. Boston Daily Globe, Feb 27, 1909. p. 2
 Pigs Seved at Deer Island; Extra Liberties Also Given Inmates of House of Correction. Boston Journal, December 26, 1914.
 "Solitary" Ends at Deer Island. Mayor Curley Orders Abolition of "Cruel" and "Barbarous" Practise at House of Correction. Boston Journal, January 29, 1916.
 Bruke Now Head at Deer Island. Former Letter Carrier Succeeds Carlton L. Brett at House of Correction. Boston Journal, March 9, 1916.
 German and Austrian sailors confined at Deer Island Prison. Boston Daily Globe, Apr 11, 1917. p. 18.
 Will give holiday to 45 prisoners; Will Leave Deer Island Prison Today. Boston Daily Globe, Nov 28, 1923. p. 20.
 Two escape from Deer Island Prison. Boston Daily Globe, Oct 4, 1924. p. 4.
 George N Lykos. Deer Island House of Correction (thesis/dissertation). MIT, 1937.
Published in the 1960s-1980s
 Massachusetts Acts and Resolves. 1968 Chap. 0363. An Act providing for work release programs at the Suffolk County House Of Correction And At The Suffolk County Jail. 1968.
 Report of the Task Force for the Public Uses of Deer Island. Boston : Commonwealth of Massachusetts, Dept. of the Attorney General, 1976.
 Brief Outburst at Prison Facility In Deer Island Being Investigated. New York Times, April 7, 1981.
 Escapee rescued from Boston Harbor; an inmate from the Deer Island House of Correction was rescued from Boston Harbor early this morning by MDC Police after swam halfway across the channel on two inflated inner tubes. Boston Globe, May 16, 1983. p. 1.
 Judge to tour Deer Island, City Prison. Boston Globe, Oct 23, 1984. p. 40.
 Joan Vennochi. Flynn supports a move of Deer Island Prison. Boston Globe, Jul 9, 1985. p. 1.
 Jennifer Miranda Bryant. Power and patronage in a prison community : an ethnology of correctional officers at Deer Island (thesis/dissertation). Harvard University, 1986.
 Diego Ribadeneira. Mistrial is declared in bribery case involving Deer Island Prison; Guard. Boston Globe, Jun 28, 1986. p. 74.
 Massachusetts Acts and Resolves. 1986 Chapter 0658. An Act Improving Jails, Houses Of Correction, And Correctional Institutions In The Commonwealth. Dec. 29, 1986.
 Linda K Holt. Suffolk County House of Correction at Deer Island : results of inmate survey. Boston: Massachusetts Dept. of Correction; Crime and Justice Foundation, 1987.
 William F. Doherty. Move sought by 1992 for Deer Island Prison; U.S. says delay could hurt harbor cleanup. Boston Globe, Apr 16, 1987. p. 71.
 Dianne Dumanoski. Judge sets '91 deadline for relocating Deer Island Prison. Boston Globe, Jul 7, 1988. p. 68.
Published in the 1990s
 Peter Jacob Freed. The myth of inmate lawlessness : prison inmates' attitudes towards criminal justice : a case study at Deer Island Prison (thesis/dissertation). Harvard University, 1990.
 Norma B Saba. Teaching urban disadvantaged prisoners : a case study (thesis/dissertation). Harvard University, 1990.
 Doris Sue Wong. Deer Island freeze ordered. Boston Globe, November 16, 1990.
 'Dungeon' set for razing; Deer Island prison will give way to sewage plant. Telegram & Gazette (Worcester, Mass.), Dec 29, 1991. p.A10.
 Michael Jacobson-Hardy. Behind the Razor Wire in Massachusetts Jails and Prisons. Massachusetts Review, Vol. 37, No. 1 (Spring, 1996), pp. 61–80.

External links

 Flickr. Photos of Deer Island, c. 1992
 Historic American Buildings Survey (Library of Congress):
 Deer Island House of Correction, Hill Prison, Deer Island (northeast & northwest quadrants), Boston, Suffolk County, MA.
 Deer Island House of Correction, Superintendent's House, Deer Island (northeast & northwest quadrants), Boston, Suffolk County, MA.
 MSSAAC (Mayor's Safe Streets Act Advisory Committee) - Funded Special Programs in the Suffolk County Detention and Correctional System Evaluation Report. 1975.
 Jay Cashman, hired to raze the prison facilities c. 1992

1896 establishments in Massachusetts
1991 disestablishments in Massachusetts
Defunct prisons in Massachusetts
Former buildings and structures in Boston
History of Boston
Buildings and structures demolished in 1992